Barilius radiolatus, or the Gunther's baril, is a freshwater fish in the family Cyprinidae. It is found in India and Nepal, although the latter may represent introductions. It inhabits clear, gravelly streams and grows to  TL. Barilius nelsoni might be its junior synonym.

References 

Radiolatus
Freshwater fish of India
Fish of Nepal
Fish described in 1868
Taxa named by Albert Günther